Churup or Tsurup (possibly from Ancash Quechua) is a mountain in the Cordillera Blanca in the Andes of Peru, about  high. It is situated in the Ancash Region, Huaraz Province, Independencia District, north-east of Huaraz. Churup is situated south of the mountain Ranrapalca, between the Rima Rima in the north-west and Collapaco and Huamashraju in the south-east, at the entrance to the Quilcayhuanca valley. Lake Churup lies at the foot of the mountain.

Gallery

References

Mountains of Peru
Mountains of Ancash Region